State Road 62 (SR 62) in the U.S. state of Indiana is an east–west route that travels  from the Illinois state line in the southwest corner of Indiana to the Louisville, Kentucky area, then northeast toward the Cincinnati, Ohio area.

Route description

SR 62 begins at the Wabash Memorial Bridge over the Wabash River between New Haven, Illinois and Posey County. It travels through Mount Vernon, Indiana and then becomes a divided highway as it approaches Evansville. Within Evansville, SR 62 forms part of the Lloyd Expressway, a divided expressway-grade highway that serves as a major east-west traffic artery through the city. The expressway contains a mix of intersections and interchanges. Nearly halfway through the city, the expressway meets US 41 and SR 62 leaves the expressway, running north concurrently with US 41 and SR 66.  At Morgan Avenue, SR 62 turns east and leaves Evansville.

East of Evansville, the four lane divided road continues to Chandler and then on to Boonville. It then becomes a two-lane road. For much of its trip through Spencer, Perry, Crawford, Harrison, and western Floyd counties, it is narrow, winding, and hilly.

SR 62 travels concurrently with I-64 and I-265, bypassing the cities of New Albany, Clarksville, and Jeffersonville. The highway then turns to the northeast, serving the cities of Charlestown, Hanover, then having a junction at SR 56, and Madison before ending at SR 262 just south of US 50 at Dillsboro.

The highway forms part of the Lincoln Heritage Trail.

History

In the pre-Interstate era, SR 62 between Evansville and New Albany was also part of US 460, a heavily traveled route between St. Louis, Missouri and Louisville, Kentucky before I-64 supplanted it as a through route.

Before the extension of I-265, SR 62 traveled directly through the cities of New Albany, Clarksville, and Jeffersonville.

Lloyd Expressway

West of US 41, SR 62 is known as the Lloyd Expressway within Vanderburgh County. It is named in honor of former Mayor Russell G. Lloyd, Sr. who was assassinated after leaving office in 1980. Evansville residents use the term "expressway" loosely due to the large number of stoplights along the Evansville stretch of the route. It is usually referred to simply as "the Lloyd".

The road was built in various stages and officially opened on July 19, 1988. The west section of the expressway was completed in the 1950s with plans to continue it east at a later date as funding became available. The $160 million expressway supplants the old Division Street/Pennsylvania Avenue corridor through the city, allowing drivers to travel from one end of the city to the other with much greater ease.

Major intersections

See also

References

External links

 

062
Transportation in Clark County, Indiana
Transportation in Crawford County, Indiana
Transportation in Dearborn County, Indiana
Transportation in Floyd County, Indiana
Transportation in Harrison County, Indiana
Transportation in Jefferson County, Indiana
Transportation in Perry County, Indiana
Transportation in Posey County, Indiana
Transportation in Ripley County, Indiana
Transportation in Spencer County, Indiana
Transportation in Vanderburgh County, Indiana
Transportation in Warrick County, Indiana
Transportation in Evansville, Indiana
Evansville metropolitan area
Boonville, Indiana
New Albany, Indiana
Jeffersonville, Indiana
Charlestown, Indiana
Madison, Indiana